The Deutsche Film- und Fernsehakademie Berlin (DFFB, German Film and Television Academy Berlin) is a film school in Berlin, Germany.

In the German film school ranking of FOCUS (Issue 22/2006), the dffb - together with the Academy of Media Arts Cologne and the international filmschool cologne - were ranked as 2nd after the Film Academy Baden-Wuerttemberg. Evaluation criteria were the reputation of the university, the support for the students, the technical equipment and the number of awards won.

It was established in 1966. Rainer Werner Fassbinder applied for a place at the Berlin Film School (dffb) twice, but was refused.

References

External links
dffb official website

Film schools in Germany
Mass media in Berlin
Universities and colleges in Berlin